Kurnur Dam is an earthfill dam on Bori river near Akkalkot, Solapur district in the state of Maharashtra in India.

Specifications

Purpose
 Irrigation
 Kurnur Dam is the origin of water for citizens in Akklkot Taluka, it is the source of water to all the farmers in the village for livelihood. It provides a fundamental need for people who lives in Kurnur village.

See also
 Dams in Maharashtra
 List of reservoirs and dams in India

References

Dams in Osmanabad district
Dams completed in 1968
1968 establishments in Maharashtra